The 2017 Mesterfinalen  was the first edition of Mesterfinalen and the 3rd Norwegian super cup overall. Mesterfinalen is an annual game between the League champions and the Cup champions, or the League number two if, as with the 2017 final, the same team are reigning League and Cup champions. Rosenborg are reigning League and Cup champions while Brann are silver medalist from the 2016 season. The match was played at Brann Stadion in Bergen 29 March.

Match details

References

Mesterfinalen
Mesterfinalen 2017
Mesterfinalen 2017
Mesterfinalen